Łukasz Kozub (born 3 November 1997) is a Polish professional volleyball player. At the professional club level, he plays for Stade Poitevin Poitiers.

He represented Poland at the 2022 Nations League.

Career

National team
On 12 April 2015, the Polish national team, including Kozub, won a title of the U19 European Champions. They beat Italy in the final (3–1). He took part in the 2015 European Youth Olympic Festival, and on 1 August 2015 achieved a gold medal after the final match with Bulgaria (3–0). On 23 August 2015, Poland achieved its first title of the U19 World Champions. In the final his team beat hosts – Argentina (3–2).

On 10 September 2016, he achieved a title of the U20 European Champion after winning 7 out of 7 matches at the tournament, and beating Ukraine in the final (3–1). On 2 July 2017, Poland, including Kozub, achieved a title of the U21 World Champions after beating Cuba in the final (3–0). Kozub was awarded an individual award for the Best Setter of the whole tournament. His national team won 47 matches in a row and never lost.

Honours

Youth national team
 2015  CEV U19 European Championship
 2015  European Youth Olympic Festival
 2015  FIVB U19 World Championship
 2016  CEV U20 European Championship
 2017  FIVB U21 World Championship

Universiade
 2019  Summer Universiade

Individual awards
 2017: FIVB U21 World Championship – Best Setter

References

External links
 
 Player profile at PlusLiga.pl 
 Player profile at Volleybox.net

1997 births
Living people
People from Rzeszów
Sportspeople from Podkarpackie Voivodeship
Polish men's volleyball players
Universiade medalists in volleyball
Universiade silver medalists for Poland
Medalists at the 2019 Summer Universiade
Polish expatriate sportspeople in France
Expatriate volleyball players in France
MKS Będzin players
Resovia (volleyball) players
Trefl Gdańsk players
Setters (volleyball)